Resava (Serbian Cyrillic: Ресава) refers to several toponyms and related topics, all of them located around the river Resava in central Serbia:

 Resava (river), a river
 Resava, a region, surrounding the river
 Resava, a monastery
 Resava school, a cultural movement in 14th-15th century started and funded by Stefan Lazarević
 Resava Coal Mines, (or REMBAS) coal mines in the Resava river valley
 Resava Cave, a cave and popular tourist attraction